Sakka is a Belgian publisher of manga; it is an imprint of Casterman.

Published titles
Astral Project – Tsuki no Hikari
Bakegyamon
Blade of the Immortal
Bobobo-bo Bo-bobo
The Book of Human Insects
Chō Sentō Inu Blanca
Crayon Shin-chan
Eagle
Gon
Kodoku no Gurume
Mirai Nikki
Monokuro Kinderbook
Skip Beat!
Toudo no Tabibito
The World Is Mine
Under the Same Moon
Yomawari Sensei

References

External links
 Sakka

Comic book publishing companies of Belgium
Manga distributors
Comic book imprints
Companies based in Hainaut (province)